Double Strike is a 1989 video game developed and published in Taiwan by Sachen.

Double strike may also refer to:

 Double stroke, in music, a rudiment consisting of alternating diddles of indeterminate speed and length
 Doublestrike or blackboard bold, a typeface style often used for certain symbols (such as ) in mathematics and physics texts
 A double struck coin, which occurs when a coin is struck twice in the minting process.